The Barbadian Permanent Representative to the United Nations and Other International Organisations in Geneva is Barbados's Permanent Representative to the United Nations Office at Geneva and other international organizations based in Geneva, Switzerland. This includes the World Trade Organization, the International Organization for Migration, the International Committee of the Red Cross, and other non-governmental organizations. Permanent Representatives normally hold the personal rank of Ambassador.

List of Permanent Representatives
2010–2016: Dr. Marion Vernese Williams
2016–2018: Bentley DeVere Gibbs

2018–: Chad Blackman

References

External links
Barbados Mission to the United Nations, Geneva (Facebook)
United Nations Office at Geneva

United Nations Geneva
Barbados
 
Barbados and the United Nations
Barbados